Duping may refer to:

 Duping (gaming), the practice of illegitimately creating duplicates of items or currency in a persistent online game
 Duping, Guangdong, a town in Fengkai County, Guangdong, China
 Duping, Guizhou (都坪), a town in Zhenyuan County, Guizhou, China
 Duping Township (笃坪乡), a township in Wushan County, Chongqing, China